The James Van Duyne Farmhouse is a historic building located at 32 Waughaw Road in the Towaco section of the township of Montville in Morris County, New Jersey. The oldest section of the farmhouse was built in 1758. It was added to the National Register of Historic Places on April 15, 1982, for its significance in exploration/settlement and politics/government.

See also
 National Register of Historic Places listings in Morris County, New Jersey
 List of the oldest buildings in New Jersey

References

Montville, New Jersey
Houses in Morris County, New Jersey
Houses on the National Register of Historic Places in New Jersey
National Register of Historic Places in Morris County, New Jersey
1758 establishments in New Jersey
New Jersey Register of Historic Places
Houses completed in 1758